The 656th Field Artillery Battalion was constituted 11 March 1944 in the Army of the United States.

Lineage
Constituted 11 March 1944 in the Army of the United States as the 656th Field Artillery Battalion
Activated 20 April 1944 at Camp Rucker, Alabama
Deployed via New York Port of Embarkation 30 November 1944
Arrived in England 8 December 1944
Arrived in France on 3 March 1945
Located at Berg Reichenstein, Germany on 14 August 1945
Returned to CONUS via New York Port of Embarkation on 29 November 1945
Inactivated 1 December 1945 at Camp Kilmer, New Jersey
Headquarters and Headquarters Battery, 656th Field Artillery Battalion, redesignated 24 December 1946 as Headquarters and Headquarters Battery, 479th Field Artillery Group, and allotted to the Organized Reserves (remainder of 656th Field Artillery Battalion concurrently disbanded)
Activated 2 January 2 January 1947 at Philadelphia, Pennsylvania
(Organized Reserves redesignated 25 March 1948 as the Organized Reserve Corps; redesignated 9 July 1952 as the Army Reserve)
Reorganized and redesignated 25 May 1959 as Headquarters and Headquarters Battery, 479th Artillery Group
Location changed 1 May 1960 to Horsham, Pennsylvania; location changed 31 January 1968 to Pittsburgh, Pennsylvania
Redesignated 1 November 1971 as Headquarters and Headquarters Battery, 479th Field Artillery Group
Redesignated 16 April 1980 as Headquarters and Headquarters Battery, 479th Field Artillery Brigade
Inactivated 15 15 September 1996 at Pittsburgh, Pennsylvania
Withdrawn 24 October 1997 from the Army Reserve and allotted to the Regular Army; Headquarters concurrently activated at Fort Sill, Oklahoma
Inactivated 16 October 1999 at Fort Sill, Oklahoma
Headquarters activated 1 December 2006 at Fort Sill, Oklahoma using the assets & personnel of 4th Brigade, 75th Division (Training Support)
Deactivated 30 June 2015 at Fort Sill

Subordinate units
1st Battalion. 289th Regiment (CS/CSS)
2nd Battalion. 290th Regiment (CS/CSS)
2nd Battalion. 381st Regiment (CS/CSS)
1st Battalion. 382nd Regiment (LSB)
1st Battalion. 393rd Regiment (Infantry)
3rd Battalion. 393rd Regiment (Field Artillery)
1st Battalion. 395th Regiment (Engineers)
3rd Battalion. 395th Regiment (Armored)

Honors

Campaign participation credit

World War II:
Rhineland;
Central Europe

Decorations
None

References

Field artillery brigades of the United States Army
Military units and formations established in 1944